Sylvia Brustad (born 19 December 1966, in Elverum) is a former Norwegian politician for the Labour Party.

Education
Brustad graduated from high school in 1983, and attended the media courses at the folk high school in Ringsaker until 1985. She then worked as a journalist, among other publications she worked for LO-aktuelt, the news publication of the Norwegian Confederation of Trade Unions.

Political career

Parliament
Brustad was elected to a county council seat in Hedmark following the local elections of 1987. In the 1989 election, she was elected to a seat in the Norwegian Parliament and left county politics.

Government
In cabinet Jagland which held office between 1996 and 1997, she was Minister for Children and Family Affairs. She was later Minister for Local Government and Regional Development in the first cabinet Stoltenberg between 2000 and 2001. Following the electoral victory of the 2005 elections, Brustad became Minister of Health and Care Services in the second cabinet Stoltenberg. She was moved to the post of Minister of Trade and Industry in June 2008 and left the government in October 2009.

Brustad became known for her role as Minister for Child and Family Affairs in 1996 when a law restricting the opening hours of shops on Sundays, holidays and after nine in the evening was passed. Only stores smaller than 100 square metres were allowed to remain open, such shops were somewhat disparagingly nicknamed "Brustadbuer" ("Brustad shacks"), until the law was quietly repealed in 2003. Brustad herself claimed that she had not personally advocated the law, but that she was required to follow through on a decision within the Labour Party.

References

1966 births
Living people
People from Elverum
Members of the Storting
Government ministers of Norway
Ministers of Children, Equality and Social Inclusion of Norway
Ministers of Local Government and Modernisation of Norway
Ministers of Health and Care Services of Norway
Labour Party (Norway) politicians
Hedmark politicians
County governors of Norway
Women government ministers of Norway
Ministers for children, young people and families
21st-century Norwegian politicians
21st-century Norwegian women politicians
20th-century Norwegian politicians
20th-century Norwegian women politicians
Women members of the Storting
Ministers of Trade and Shipping of Norway